= David Jones (antiquary, fl. 1560–1590) =

Welsh antiquarian

- Occupations: Poet and antiquarian

David Jones (fl. 1560–1590) was a Welsh poet and antiquary.

== Biography ==
Jones was vicar of Llanfair Dyffryn Clwyd in Denbighshire towards the close of the sixteenth century. One of the forged Taliesin poems, known as ‘Yr Awdl Fraith,’ was translated by him into Latin sapphics, under the date of 1580, and was published in Nicholas Owen's ‘British Remains,’ pp. 121–8, London, 1777, and subsequently in Jones's ‘Bardic Museum.’ Some of Jones's Welsh poems are preserved among the Additional MSS. at the British Museum, where there is also a volume of ancient Welsh poetry transcribed by him, and presented to one John Williams, 12 February 1587. Hengwrt MS. 66 also contains a prayer of St. Augustine, and ‘Dengran Kristionogion y Byd,’ translated from Latin into Welsh by Jones.
